The players draft for the seventh season of Pakistan Super League took place on 12 December 2021 at the High Performance Centre in Lahore. Before the draft, the teams were allowed to retain a maximum of 8 players and make any transfers. The transfer and retention window closed on 10 December 2021.

Background
The Pakistan Cricket Board announced that Lahore Qalandars will have the first pick. The total purse for each team was capped at $1.2 million.

Each team was also allowed to pick two additional players in the supplementary round. They also had the right to exercise one wildcard pick. In a first in PSL, right-to-match cards were introduced allowing franchises to buy back a maximum of one player that they have released on the draft day by paying the respective fee against each category:
 Platinum ($130,000-$170,000)
 Diamond ($60,000-$80,000)
 Gold ($40,000-$50,000)
 Silver ($15,000-$25,000)
 Emerging ($7,500)

Transfers 
Shahid Afridi and Englishman James Vince were traded from the Multan Sultans to the Quetta Gladiators. As part of the transfer, the Sultans took Quetta's diamond and silver round picks, respectively.
2021 season's Islamabad United players Iftikhar Ahmed was swapped with Quetta Gladiators' wicket-keeper-batsman Azam Khan, while Hussain Talat was traded to Peshawar Zalmi in return for Zalmi's silver category 2nd round pick.

Retained players
On 10 December 2021, the Pakistan Cricket Board announced the retention players list. All the teams were allowed to retain a maximum of 8 players from the previous season. All four franchises fully utilized their quota of eight player retentions apart from Multan Sultans and Quetta Gladiators.

Draft picks
More than 425 players from 32 countries were registered for the draft. For the emerging category, players should be under 23 as of 1 January 2022 and could have either played less than 10 PSL matches in previous seasons but have not been selected in the national squad.

Replacements
A replacement player draft took place through a virtual session on 8 January 2022, in which the franchises were also allowed on their request to pick additional two supplementary players. The order of selection was decided through random draw, with each team allowed to pick maximum one foreign player. Zalmi and Gladiators, each reserved their one pick; and announced the names on 17 January.

Few other replacements were announced afterwards. Earlier, players from Cricket South Africa were also in contact to sign in due to cancellation of the 2022 Mzansi Super League, however they were not allowed due to prior commitments of South African cricket team in New Zealand in 2021–22.

List of additional players to be kept in a bio-secure bubble, in case of emergency replacement was announced on 20 January.

References

Cricket in Pakistan
Pakistan Super League player drafts
2022 Pakistan Super League